Navet Confit is a Canadian indie rock band featuring musician Jean-Philippe Fréchette. He has released music through his own label La Confiserie, and La Meute.

Career 
Originally from the Beauce region of Quebec and based in Montreal, he has released seven albums and three EPs on the independent record labels Dry and Dead and La Confiserie. In 2006 he released his first album, LP1. He also released the 24 track double album LP2 that featured contributions by Fred Fortin, Carl-Éric Hudon, Émilie Proulx, Vincent Peake, Polipe et Jeremi Mourand. The album was nominated for an ADISQ award in 2008.

In 2013 he signed with the label La Meute and released the album Bestove. Live he performs with the Dauphins Vampires, which consists of Alex Champigny (guitars/keyboards), Carl-Éric Hudon (bass) and Lydia Champagne (drums).

In 2007, he also collaborated with Fred Fortin of Les Breastfeeders, Simon Proulx of Les Trois Accords and Vincent Peake of Groovy Aardvark in the supergroup Vauvandalou, who released the one-off single "0.99$" through Bande à part and Radio-Canada's Le Fric Show.

In 2016 he provided the sound design for the theatre production Yukon Style.

The name translates as candied turnip.

Discography

EPs 
EP1, 2004
EP2, 2005
EP3, 2006
EP4, 2006
EP5/Platitude Confortable, 2009

Albums 
LP1, 2006 
LP2, 2007
LP3, 2009
Bestove, 2013
LP5/Thérapie, 2013
LOL (2015)
Magasin de mannequins (2016)

References

External links
 Navet Confit official website
 Navet Confit at Bande à part

Musical groups established in 2001
Canadian indie rock groups
Musical groups from Montreal
2001 establishments in Quebec